Greenwood Colony is a Hutterite colony and census-designated place (CDP) in Douglas County, South Dakota, United States. The population was 11 at the 2020 census. It was first listed as a CDP prior to the 2020 census.

It is in the southeast part of the county, bordered to the south by Charles Mix County.

Demographics

References 

Census-designated places in Douglas County, South Dakota
Census-designated places in South Dakota
Hutterite communities in the United States